Andrzej Nędza-Kubiniec (born 19 June 1991) is a Polish biathlete. He competed in the 2018 Winter Olympics.

Biathlon results
All results are sourced from the International Biathlon Union.

World Championships
0 medals

*During Olympic seasons competitions are only held for those events not included in the Olympic program.
**The single mixed relay was added as an event in 2019.

References

1991 births
Living people
Biathletes at the 2018 Winter Olympics
Polish male biathletes
Olympic biathletes of Poland
Sportspeople from Zakopane